Myscelia ethusa, the Mexican bluewing or blue wing, is a butterfly of the family Nymphalidae. The species was first described by Louis Michel François Doyère in 1840. It is found from Colombia north through Central America to Mexico. Strays can be found up to the lower Rio Grande Valley of Texas in the United States.

Many generations occur per year.

The larvae feed on the Dalechampia species. Adults feed on rotting fruit.

Subspecies
Listed alphabetically:
 M. e. chiapensis  Jenkins, 1984 (Mexico)
 M. e. cyanecula C. Felder & R. Felder, 1867 (Mexico)
 M. e. ethusa (Mexico)
 M. e. pattenia  Butler & H. Druce, 1872 (Guatemala and Costa Rica)

References

External links

Biblidinae
Butterflies described in 1840
Butterflies of North America
Nymphalidae of South America